Hunter is a census-designated place (CDP) in Franklin Township, Warren County, Ohio, United States. The population was 2,100 at the 2010 census.

Geography
Hunter is located at  (39.493322, -84.289992).

Demographics

As of the census of 2000, there were 1,737 people, 682 households, and 553 families residing in the CDP. The population density was 1,081.8 people per square mile (416.6/km2). There were 692 housing units at an average density of 431.0/sq mi (166.0/km2). The racial makeup of the CDP was 98.62% White, 0.23% African American, 0.35% Native American, 0.06% Asian, 0.23% from other races, and 0.52% from two or more races. Hispanic or Latino of any race were 0.46% of the population.

There were 682 households, out of which 29.5% had children under the age of 18 living with them, 71.1% were married couples living together, 6.3% had a female householder with no husband present, and 18.9% were non-families. 16.4% of all households were made up of individuals, and 5.7% had someone living alone who was 65 years of age or older. The average household size was 2.55 and the average family size was 2.85.

In the CDP, the population was spread out, with 20.8% under the age of 18, 6.8% from 18 to 24, 26.7% from 25 to 44, 31.4% from 45 to 64, and 14.3% who were 65 years of age or older. The median age was 42 years. For every 100 females, there were 101.3 males. For every 100 females age 18 and over, there were 98.4 males.

The median income for a household in the CDP was $47,132, and the median income for a family was $54,917. Males had a median income of $38,947 versus $28,064 for females. The per capita income for the CDP was $25,245. About 2.0% of families and 1.0% of the population were below the poverty line, including 1.8% of those under age 18 and none of those age 65 or over.

References

Further reading
 Elva R. Adams. Warren County Revisited. [Lebanon, Ohio]: Warren County Historical Society, 1989.
 Ohio Atlas & Gazetteer. 6th ed. Yarmouth, Maine: DeLorme, 2001. 
 Warren County Engineer's Office. Official Highway Map 2003. Lebanon, Ohio: The Office, 2003.

Census-designated places in Warren County, Ohio
Census-designated places in Ohio